Ascelina (1121–1195), was a French Cistercian nun and mystic.

Ascelina spent the majority of her life at the Cistercian convent at Boulancourt, Haute-Marne, France. It is believed that she was a relative of St. Bernard.

References

French Roman Catholic saints
12th-century Christian saints
1195 deaths
Cistercian nuns
1121 births
Christian female saints of the Middle Ages